Call Me Human is a Canadian documentary film, directed by Kim O'Bomsawin and released in 2020. The film is a portrait of Innu poet Joséphine Bacon.

The film premiered at the Quebec City Film Festival. It was subsequently screened at the Cinéfest Sudbury International Film Festival and the 2020 Vancouver International Film Festival, and had its commercial premiere on November 13.

Awards
At the Quebec City Film festival, the film was cowinner of the Prix Jury collégial with Alexandre Rockwell's Sweet Thing. At Cinefest, it won the Audience Choice Award for documentaries, and at VIFF, it won the juried award for Best Canadian Documentary Film.

The film initially received three Prix Iris nominations at the 23rd Quebec Cinema Awards in 2021, for Best Documentary, Best Cinematography in a Documentary (Hugo Gendron, Michel Valiquette) and Best Editing in a Documentary (Alexandre Lachance). After the organization decided to add the eligible documentary films to its Public Prize ballot, the film was also named as a nominee in that category.

The film won the Prix collégial du cinéma québécois in 2021.

References

External links

2020 films
2020 documentary films
Canadian documentary films
Documentary films about First Nations
Quebec films
Innu culture
2020s Canadian films